Saiza is a village in Tierralta Municipality, Córdoba Department Department in Colombia.

Climate
Saiza has a tropical rainforest climate (Af) with heavy rainfall year-round.

References

Populated places in the Córdoba Department